The 2000–01 Scottish Third Division was won by Hamilton Academical who, along with second placed Cowdenbeath, gained promotion to the Second Division. Elgin City finished bottom.

Table

Scottish Third Division seasons
3
4
Scot